Yelets, or Elets, is a city in Lipetsk Oblast, Russia, situated on the Bystraya Sosna River, which is a tributary of the Don. Population:

History

Yelets is the oldest center of the Central Black Earth Region. It was mentioned in historical documents as early as 1146 or 1147, when it was a fort belonging to the Princes of Ryazan. The town's position at the very south of Russian lands made it an easy prey for Turkic conquerors. The Mongols burned it in 1239, Uzbeg Khan ravaged it in 1316, Timur sacked it in 1395, and the Tatars devastated it in 1414.

In 1483, the Principality of Yelets was absorbed by the Grand Duchy of Moscow, while the local Rurikid rulers (last heard of in the 19th century) entered the service of Ivan III. In 1591, Boris Godunov revived the largely deserted town by establishing a fortress there. In 1618, the fortress was captured "by subterfuge" by 20,000 Cossacks under Petro Konashevych-Sahaidachny, allied with Władysław IV of Poland. They dismantled a large part of town fortifications.

In the 19th century, Yelets became the largest trade center of the region. Handmade lace has been a notable product of the city since then; other important industries are grain milling and the manufacture of machinery. The town's chief landmark is the vast Ascension Cathedral, built over the years 1845–1889 to a Neo-Muscovite design by Konstantin Thon. The town was occupied by the German Army from December 4 to 9, 1941 and damaged during the brief occupation and Soviet offensive in the region.

Climate

Administrative and municipal status
Within the framework of administrative divisions, Yelets serves as the administrative center of Yeletsky District, even though it is not a part of it. As an administrative division, it is incorporated as Yelets City Under Oblast Jurisdiction—an administrative unit with a status equal to that of the districts. As a municipal division, Yelets City Under Oblast Jurisdiction is incorporated as Yelets Urban Okrug.

Economy and transportation

The city is connected to Moscow, Lipetsk, Oryol, and Rostov by rail and the M4 highway runs past it.

The main industries are limestone quarrying, engineering, food processing, textiles and clothing (Yelets Lace), tobacco processing, and vodka distilling.

Culture and education
The city has a theatre, cinemas, and several sports venues.

The Yelets State University was upgraded from an institute in 2000 and the city has eight secondary schools.

Notable people 

 Iulia Dombrovskaia, pediatrician born in Yelets in 1891.
 Tikhon Khrennikov, composer and administrator born in Yelets in 1913.

References

Notes

Sources

Cities and towns in Lipetsk Oblast
Yeletsky Uyezd